Aleksandra Rosolska (born 17 November 1984) is a retired Polish tennis player.

Rosolska has won two doubles titles on the ITF Circuit in her career. On 3 December 2007, she reached her best singles ranking of world No. 993. On 17 August 2009, she peaked at No. 307 in the doubles rankings.

Rosolska made her WTA Tour main-draw debut at the 2009 Warsaw Open, in the doubles event partnering Karolina Kosińska.	

Her sister, Alicja Rosolska, is also a tennis player.

ITF finals

Singles (0–1)

Doubles (2–5)

External links
 
 

1984 births
Living people
Tennis players from Warsaw
Polish female tennis players
21st-century Polish women